Maksym Brama (born 1 February 2002) is a professional Ukrainian football defender who played for FC Lviv.

Career
Brama is a product of the different local (including FC Lviv) youth sportive school systems.

He played for FC Lviv in the Ukrainian Premier League Reserves and in May 2019 Brama was promoted to the senior squad of this team. He made his debut in the Ukrainian Premier League for FC Lviv as a substituted on 30 May 2019, playing in a lost match against FC Shakhtar Donetsk.

References

External links 
Profile at UAF Official Site (Ukr)

2002 births
Living people
People from Vynnyky
Ukrainian footballers
FC Lviv players
Ukrainian Premier League players
Association football defenders
Ukraine youth international footballers
Sportspeople from Lviv Oblast